The Sevan trout (Salmo ischchan) is an endemic fish species of Lake Sevan in Armenia, known as ishkhan (իշխան) in Armenian. It is a salmonid fish related to the brown trout.

The fish is endangered, because various competitors were introduced into the lake during the Soviet period, including common whitefish (Coregonus lavaretus) from Lake Ladoga, goldfish (Carassius auratus) and narrow-clawed crayfish (Astacus leptodactylus); and because of lake level change. On the other hand, the Sevan trout itself has been successfully introduced to Issyk Kul lake in Kyrgyzstan.

A resolution by Armenia's Council of Ministers in 1976 stopped the commercial fishing of Sevan trout and organized Sevan National Park.  The fish are nowadays also reared in hatcheries.

The Sevan trout has four (or two) distinct strains differing in their breeding time and place, and growth rate: 
winter bakhtak (Salmo ischchan ischchan)
summer bakhtak (Salmo ischchan aestivalis)
gegharkuni (Salmo ischchan gegarkuni)
bojak (Salmo ischchan danilewskii).

The winter bakhtak is the largest form and can grow to considerable size, up to 90 cm and 15 kg. It breeds within the lake. The summer bakhtak is smaller (<50 cm), and breeds naturally  both in rivers and within lake near river mouths. Gegharkuni is a migratory form that naturally breeds exclusively in rivers; it also feeds on plankton in addition to benthos. Bojak in turn is a dwarfed form that breeds within the lake in the winter, and does not exceed 33 cm and 0.25 kg.

Water level regulation has been destructive for sevan trout reproduction. Currently, the  summer bakhtak and gegharkuni are mainly propagated by hatcheries. The winter bakhtak and bojak may be extinct within the lake.

From a study of historical samples, the four strains or forms are not diagnosable by their mitochondrial DNA sequences. As a whole, the Sevan trout is phylogenetically very close to the Caspian trout, within the brown trout complex.

References

Salmo
Freshwater fish of Asia
Endemic fauna of Armenia
Fish described in 1877